Rodrigo Meneses Quintanilha (born December 11, 1992), known as Rodrigo Maranhão, is a Brazilian football player for Phrae United.

Career
After some experiences between Brazil and Thailand, Rodrigo Maranhão opted to sign for Zweigen Kanazawa in December 2017.

On the 10th of June 2021 Rodrigo Maranhão signed for Phrae United He finished the first leg of the 2022/23 Thai League 2 season as equal third highest goal scorer in the League with 8 goals.

Club statistics
Updated to 28 August 2018.

References

External links

Profile at J. League
Profile at Zweigen Kanazawa

1992 births
Living people
Brazilian footballers
Brazilian expatriate footballers
J2 League players
K League 2 players
Rodrigo Maranhao
Rodrigo Maranhao
Campeonato Brasileiro Série B players
Atlético Clube Goianiense players
União Agrícola Barbarense Futebol Clube players
Clube Atlético Bragantino players
Rodrigo Maranhao
Rodrigo Maranhao
Zweigen Kanazawa players
Bucheon FC 1995 players
Rodrigo Maranhao
Rodrigo Maranhao
Esporte Clube Água Santa players
Association football forwards
Brazilian expatriate sportspeople in Thailand
Brazilian expatriate sportspeople in Japan
Brazilian expatriate sportspeople in South Korea
Expatriate footballers in Thailand
Expatriate footballers in Japan
Expatriate footballers in South Korea
Sportspeople from Maranhão